MHS Aviation GmbH is a German charter airline headquartered in Oberhaching, Bavaria. MHS Aviation is based at nearby Munich Airport, Special Airport Oberpfaffenhofen as well as Mannheim City Airport. The company specializes in aircraft charter, aircraft management, aircraft lease and VIP service. It currently operates a fleet of 20 charter aircraft. The majority of the fleet consists of business aircraft. In addition, six Dornier 328 aircraft are operated for Rhein-Neckar Air on a scheduled domestic service.

History 
The company was founded as Munich Helicopter Service (MHS) in 1977.

After the purchase of the airline by the entrepreneur Gerhard Brandecker in 2009, the airline put a focus on adding business jets to its fleet. MHS Aviation has been in business for more than 40 years and has developed into one of the largest executive charter operators in Germany. In October 2019 MHS Aviation took delivery of Europe's first Embraer Praetor 600.

Services 
MHS Aviation specializes in aircraft charter, aircraft lease and fleet management. It currently operates several business jets of different sizes.

Destinations 
MHS Aviation performs both passenger and cargo charter flights. It operates international charter flights as well domestic scheduled services.

Fleet

Current fleet

As of November 2019, the MHS Aviation fleet consists of the following aircraft. Currently the fleet consists of 18 aircraft ranging from ultra-long range to turbo prop aircraft. Since June 2017 MHS Aviation operates two Dassault Falcon 2000LX by the French aircraft manufacturer Dassault Aviation.

Former fleet
The airline previously operated the following aircraft (at November 2019):

 1 Gulfstream G-650
1 Gulfstream G-550
1 Learjet 60
1 Dornier 328

See also 

 Air transport in Germany
 List of airlines of Germany

References

External links

Official website

Airlines of Germany
Airlines established in 1977
1977 establishments in West Germany
Companies based in Bavaria
Companies based in Oberhaching